National Route 175 is a national highway of Japan connecting Akashi, Hyōgo and Maizuru, Kyoto in Japan, with a total length of .

See also

References

175
Roads in Hyōgo Prefecture
Roads in Kyoto Prefecture